AS Tamarii is a football (soccer) club in Faaa, Tahiti. They play in the Tahiti First Division. They play home games at Stade Louis Ganivet.

References

Football clubs in Tahiti
Football clubs in French Polynesia